Classical Mongolian was the literary language of Mongolian which was first introduced shortly after 1600, when Ligdan Khan set his clergy the task of translating the whole of the Tibetan Buddhist canon, consisting of the Kanjur and Tanjur, into Mongolian. This script then became the established literary language used for all Mongolian literature since its introduction, until the 1930s when the Mongolian Latin script was established, which then in 1941 was replaced by the Mongolian Cyrillic script.

Classical Mongolian was formerly used in Mongolia, China, and Russia. It is a standardized written language used in the 18th century and 20th centuries. Notable texts include the translation of the Kanjur and Tanjur and several chronicles roughly between 1700 and 1900.

Classical Mongolian sometimes refers to any language documents in Mongolian script that are neither Pre-classical (i.e. Middle Mongol in Mongolian script) nor modern Mongolian.

Notes

Sources

See also
Middle Mongolian

Mongolic languages
Extinct languages of Asia
Mongolian, Classical
Sacred languages
Languages attested from the 17th century
Languages extinct in the 1900s